The year 1828 in science and technology involved some significant events, listed below.

Astronomy
 Félix Savary computes the first orbit of a visual double star when he calculates the orbit of the double star Xi Ursae Majoris.

Biology
 April 27 – London Zoo opens in Regent's Park for members of the Zoological Society of London.
 Karl Ernst von Baer lays the foundations of the science of comparative embryology with his book Über Entwickelungsgeschichte der Thiere. He publishes von Baer's laws.
 Martin Lichtenstein publishes a monograph on the Dipodidae, Über die Springmäuse, in Berlin.
 Belfast Botanic Gardens open.

Chemistry
 Swedish chemist Jöns Jakob Berzelius produces a table of atomic weights and discovers thorium.
 Urea becomes the first organic compound to be artificially synthesised, by Friedrich Wöhler, establishing that organic compounds could be produced from inorganic starting materials and potentially disproving a cornerstone of vitalism, the belief that life is not subject to the laws of science in the way inanimate objects are.
 The van Houten family of the Netherlands invent a press to remove about 50% of the cocoa butter from chocolate.

Medicine
 February 19 – The Boston Society for Medical Improvement is established in the United States.
 April 17 – Royal Free Hospital, established as the London General Institution for the Gratuitous Care of Malignant Diseases by surgeon William Marsden, opens.
 December 24 – Burke and Hare murders: William Burke is sentenced to hang for his part in the murder of 17 victims to provide bodies for dissection by Edinburgh anatomist Robert Knox.
 F. Maury publishes Traité Complet de l'Art du Dentiste, the first handbook of dentistry.

Paleontology
 January 7 – Rev. Henry Duncan describes his discovery of the fossil footmarks of quadrupeds (Chelichnus duncani) in Permian red sandstone in south west Scotland, the first scientific report of a fossil track.
 December – Mary Anning discovers Britain's first pterosaur fossil at Lyme Regis on the Jurassic Coast of England.
 Adolphe Theodore Brongniart publishes Prodrome d'une histoire des Végétaux Fossils, a study of fossil plants.

Physics
 Self-taught English mathematician George Green publishes An Essay on the Application of Mathematical Analysis to the Theories of Electricity and Magnetism in Nottingham, the first mathematical theory of electricity and magnetism, introducing a form of divergence theorem (a version of Green's theorem), the idea of potential theory, and the concept of what will come to be called Green's functions.
 Irish astronomer William Rowan Hamilton publishes Theory of Systems of Rays.

Technology
 October 1 – James Beaumont Neilson of Scotland patents the hot blast process for ironmaking.
 Ányos Jedlik creates the world's first electric motor.
 The brothers John and Charles Deane produce the first diving helmet by adaptation of a smoke helmet produced for them by Augustus Siebe.
 Scottish architect Peter Nicholson sets out a method of preparing stones for construction of a helicoidal skew arch.
 John Deats obtains his first United States patent for an improved plow.

Institutions
 Imperial Petersburg Institute of Technology established in the Russian Empire.

Awards
 Copley Medal: not awarded

Births
 April 17
 Sampson Gamgee (died 1886), Tuscan-born English surgeon.
 Johanna Mestorf (died 1909), German prehistoric archaeologist. 
 March 24 – Jules Verne (died 1905), French science fiction author.
 April 29 – Étienne Stéphane Tarnier (died 1897), French obstetrician.
 May 8 – Jean Henri Dunant (died 1910), Swiss founder of the Red Cross.
 June 21 – Ferdinand André Fouqué (died 1904), French geologist and petrologist.
 July 23 – Jonathan Hutchinson (died 1913), English physician.
 August 6 – Andrew Taylor Still (died 1917), American "father of osteopathy".
 August 28 – William A. Hammond (died 1900),  American military physician and neurologist.
 September 15 – Aleksandr Butlerov (died 1886), Russian chemist.
 October 31 – Joseph Swan (died 1914), English surgeon.
 November 22 – Lydia Shackleton (died 1914), Irish botanical artist.

Deaths
 March 17 – James Edward Smith (born 1759), English botanist.
 March 23 – David Friesenhausen (born 1756), German-Hungarian-Jewish rabbi, mathematician and astronomer.
 July 5 – Andrew Duncan (born 1744), Scottish physician.
 August 8 – Carl Peter Thunberg (born 1743), Swedish botanist.
 August 22 – Franz Joseph Gall (born 1758), German-born neuroanatomist.
 September 3 - Jean Boniface Textoris (born 1773), French military surgeon.
 December 22 – William Hyde Wollaston (born 1766), English chemist.

References

 
19th century in science
1820s in science